Brutal Panda Records is an American record label founded in 2008 and based in Philadelphia, Pennsylvania. The label focuses on high quality limited edition vinyl releases from metal bands and elaborate packaging.

Recent news
In February 2010 the label announced the release of Millions' EP, "Panic Program." Recorded at Bricktop Recording in Chicago, IL. and produced by Andy Nelson (Harpoon, Weekend Nachos), described as "what was exciting about the Windy City in the late ‘80s and early ‘90s... Gnarly guitar work and bruising beats (think Jesus Lizard and Rapeman)." -Revolver

Artists and releases
 The Atlas Moth
 An Ache for the Distance 12" Vinyl
 Black Tusk
 "Fatal Kiss"/"Fire and Stone"/"Too Much Paranoias" Split 7" Vinyl with Fight Amp
Cherubs
 2 YNFYNYTY 12" vinyl/cassette
 Dark Castle
 Surrender to All Life Beyond Form 12" Vinyl
 Fight Amp
 Manners and Praise 12 Vinyl
 Hungry for Nothing 12" Vinyl
 "Fatal Kiss"/"Fire and Stone"/"Too Much Paranoias" Split 7" Vinyl with Black Tusk
 Harkonen
 Shake Harder Boy 12" Vinyl
 Horseback
 "On The Eclipse" 7" Vinyl
 Javelina
 Beasts Among Sheep 12" Vinyl
 Ladder Devils
 Nowhere Plans 12" Vinyl
 Megasus
 Menace of the Universe 5" Vinyl
 Millions
 "Panic Program" 7" Vinyl
 Norska
 S/T 12" Vinyl
 Primitive Weapons
 The Shadow Gallery 12" Vinyl
 Ramming Speed
 Brainwreck 12" Vinyl
ShinerSchadenfreude, cassette edition
 Whores
 Ruiner'' 12" Vinyl

References

External links
 
 http://www.linkedin.com/companies/brutal-panda-records 
 Brutal Panda Records

American record labels
Record labels established in 2008
American companies established in 2008
2008 establishments in Pennsylvania